Ask Father is a short, 13-minute, slapstick-style comedy made by Harold Lloyd in 1919 before his entry into full-length feature films. Aside from Lloyd, it features Snub Pollard and leading lady Bebe Daniels.

Plot
Lloyd is a serious young middle-class guy on the make, who wants to marry the boss’ daughter. The problem is getting in to see the boss so that he can ask for her hand in marriage; the office is guarded by a bunch of comic, clumsy flunkies who throw everyone out who tries to get in. When Lloyd gets into the boss’ office, the latter uses trap doors and conveyor belts to expel him; Lloyd then goes to the costume company next door, tries to get in wearing drag (no success), and then in medieval armor – that works, since he bangs everyone over the head with his club. When he learns that the daughter has eloped with another suitor, Lloyd decides to be sensible and he settles for the cute switchboard operator (Daniels) instead. The film includes a brief wall climbing sequence.

Cast
 Harold Lloyd - The Boy
 Bebe Daniels - Switchboard operator
 Snub Pollard - The Corn-Fed Secretary
 Wallace Howe - The Boss
 Bud Jamison - Guardian at the door
 Noah Young - Large office worker
 Sammy Brooks - Short office worker
 Marie Mosquini - The Boy's First Love
 James Parrott - Willie, The Boy’s Rival
 Harry Burns
 William Gillespie - Office worker
 Lew Harvey
 Margaret Joslin
 Dorothea Wolbert
 Charles Stevenson - The Cop

See also
 List of American films of 1919
 Harold Lloyd filmography

External links
 
 

1919 films
Silent American comedy films
1919 comedy films
American black-and-white films
American silent short films
Films directed by Hal Roach
1919 short films
Films with screenplays by H. M. Walker
American comedy short films
1910s American films
1910s English-language films